The A25 is a  long motorway in northern France. It is also part of European Route E42.

Route
The road connects (with the N225) the English Channel port of Dunkerque with the major city of Lille.
The road has no tolls.

Junctions

External links

A25 autoroute in Saratlas

A25